Sakurajima may refer to:

Places
 10516 Sakurajima, the asteroid "Sakurajima", a Main Belt asteroid, the 10516th minor planet registered

Japan
Kagoshima
 Sakurajima, a volcano, mountain, former island, peninsula, in Kagoshima, Kyushu, Japan
 Sakurajima, Kagoshima, Kyushu, Japan; a neighbourhood and former town

Osaka
 Sakurajima Line, a rail line in Osaka, Japan
 Sakurajima Station, a rail station in Konohana-ku, Osaka, Japan

People
Characters
 Mai Sakurajima, a fictional character from Rascal Does Not Dream of Bunny Girl Senpai

Food
 Sakurajima daikon radish ("sakurajima"), a Japanese radish, a variety of daikon
 Sakurajima komikan orange ("sakurajima"), a Japanese orange, a variety of komikan

Other uses
 Sakurajima Ferry, a ferry between Kagoshima Port and Sakurajima Port in the city of Kagoshima
 Sakurajima (novella), a novella by Japanese writer Haruo Umezaki

See also

 
 
 
 
 
 
 Sakura (disambiguation)
 Jima (disambiguation)